Għar Dalam ("Cave of Dalam" (a fifteenth century family name)) is a 144 metre long phreatic tube and cave, or cul-de-sac, located in the outskirts of Birżebbuġa, Malta. The cave contains the bone remains of animals that were stranded and subsequently became extinct in Malta at the end of the Last Glacial Maximum. It has lent its name to the Għar Dalam phase in Maltese prehistory, and is viewed as one of Malta's most important national monuments. Pottery similar to that found in Stentinello was found at Għar Dalam, but lacking details such as stamp decorations.

Dwarf elephant, hippopotamus, giant swan, deer and bear bone deposits found there are of different ages; the hippopotamuses became extinct about 10,000 years ago, whilst the deer species became extinct much later, about 4000 years ago during the Chalcolithic. It is also here that the earliest evidence of human settlement on Malta, some 7,400 years ago, was discovered.

Recent history

The cave was first investigated for its Neolithic remains in 1865, with excavations by Italian palaeontologist Arturo Issel. An excavation was carried out in 1892 by John H. Cooke. The bulk of this material was stored in Malta, while a comparative collection was sent to the British Museum. This material was studied by Forsyth Major in 1902, who isolated a new dwarf species of dwarf hippopotamus, Hippopotamus melitensis, based on these findings.

The cave was included on the Antiquities List of 1925, but was not opened to the public until March 1933. A museum was set up on site by the then-Curator of Natural History, Joseph Baldacchino. Within a year of his appointment as curator in 1935, Baldacchino published a booklet on Għar Dalam, highlighting the main excavations and investigations of the cave. The museum was slowly upgraded, new specimens replacing the old, and a labelling system set in place.

The showcases around the walls of the Għar Dalam museum house skeletal remains found in the cave. These are organised by species and type. The showcases in the centre of the museum's room contain complete skeletons of modern examples of deer, elephant and other species. These were not found in the cave, but imported as reference specimens for the use of scholars working on the fossil examples.

It was used as an air-raid shelter during World War II. In 1980, the most important and irreplaceable relics—such as four tusks of dwarf elephants and the skull of a Neolithic child—were stolen from the museum.

The museum, which still exhibits a remarkable wealth of finds from animal bones to human artifacts, is the entrance to the whole area.

Għar Dalam Cave and Museum is operated by Heritage Malta. In 2019, a project was announced to improve the physical accessibility between Għar Dalam, Ta’ Kaċċatura, Borġ in-Nadur, and other sites which are in close proximity to one another.

Stratigraphy

The cave consists of six layers.
Domestic animal layer (c. 74 cm). This layer has mainly cultivated animals in it, such as cows, horses and sheep/goats. Human remains, like pottery, flints, tools and ornaments or amulets are present here.
Calcareous sheet (c. 0.6 cm).
Deer Layer (c. 175 cm). The dwarf deer found in this layer are derived from the red deer (Cervus elaphus). Small numbers of carnivores are known from this layer, namely brown bear, red fox and wolf. Also big swans, giant turtles and voles are found.
Pebble layer (c. 35 cm). This layer consists completely of small boulders and pebbles. They are indicators of a river that streamed through the cave. The stones are quite large, as it was a fast-flowing river.
Hippopotamus layer (c. 120 cm). This layer consists of mainly Hippopotamus melitensis. Other species found are dwarf elephant and the giant dormouse Leithia cartei.
Bone-Free clay layer (c. 125 cm). No bones found in this layer, only some impressions of plant material

Notes 

 [A].  Buhagiar (2007) notes that the name Għar Dalam does not mean the 'Cave of Darkness,' but the 'Cave of Dalam,' or 'of the Dalam family.' The surname Dalam is attested in 15th century records.

References

External links

 National Inventory of the Cultural Property of the Maltese Islands
 Description of cave
 Għar Dalam Cave and Museum  - Visit Malta

Caves of Malta
Archaeological sites in Malta
Archaeological museums in Malta
Prehistoric sites in Malta
Birżebbuġa
National Inventory of the Cultural Property of the Maltese Islands
Sites managed by Heritage Malta